This is a list of lakes of Ontario beginning with the letter E.

Ea
Eabamet Lake 
Eade Lake (Sudbury District) 
Eade Lake (Cochrane District) 
Eady Lake 
Eadys Lake (Whitewater Region)
Eadys Lake (North Algona Wilberforce)
Eag Lake 
Eager Lake 
Eagle Lake (Machar)
Eagle Lake (Cole Township, Timiskaming District)
Eagle Lake (Frontenac County) 
Eagle Lake (Cochrane District) 
Eagle Lake (Machin)
Eagle Lake (Muskoka District) 
Eagle Lake (Carling)
Eagle Lake (Algoma District) 
Eagle Lake (Bird River, Kenora District) 
Eagle Lake (Chown Township, Timiskaming District)
Eagle Lake (Haliburton County)
Eagle Rock Lake 
Eaglecrest Lake 
Eaglehead Lake 
Eaglenest Lake (Kenora District) 
Eaglenest Lake (Selkirk Township, Sudbury District)
Eaglenest Lake (Sheppard Township, Sudbury District)
Eaglerock Lake 
Eaglet Lake 
Eaket Lake 
Ear Lake (Algoma District) 
Ear Lake (Rainy River District) 
Earl Lake (Earl Township, Sudbury District)
Earl Lake (Gallagher Township, Sudbury District)
Earl's Lake 
Earley Lake 
Earls Lake 
Early Lake 
Earngey Lake 
Easen Lake 
Easey Lake 
East Ahmabel Lake 
East Alder Lake 
East Bass Lake 
East Bear Lake 
East Bouchard Lake 
East Bradburn Lake 
East Brophy Lake 
East Bruce Lake 
East Buck Lake 
East Caribou Lake 
East Carty Lake 
East Chaplin Lake 
East Coyle Lake 
East Cranberry Pond 
East Cypress Lake 
East Divide Lake 
East Dog Lake 
East Dundonald Lake 
East Emerson Lake 
East End Lake 
East Fox Lake 
East Galipo Lake 
East Godson Lake 
East Hardtack Lake 
East Hillsport Lake 
East Hopian Lake 
East Howry Lake 
East Jeannie Lakes 
East Jones Lake 
East Ketchikan Lake 
East Kidd Lake 
East Lake (Troutlake River, Kenora District)
East Lake (Loach Township, Algoma District)
East Lake (Wardle Township, Algoma District)
East Lake (Haliburton County) 
East Lake (Wild Lake, Kenora District)
East Lake (Rainy River District) 
East Lake (Joint Lake, Kenora District)
East Lake (Prince Edward County) 
East Lake (Grenoble Township, Algoma District)
East Legge Lake 
East Lily Lake 
East Mageau Lake 
East Mattawishkwia Lake 
East Middleton Lake 
East Montreuil Lake 
East Moore Lake 
East Moose Lake 
East Moseau Lake 
East Neely Lake 
East Night Hawk Lake 
East Oscar Lake 
East Paint Lake 
East Pashkokogan Lake 
East Percy Lake 
East Plover Lake 
East Pond 
East Pukaskwa Lake 
East Revell Lake 
East Rufus Lake 
East Ryan Lake 
East Shesheb Lake 
East Shining Tree Lake 
East Solomon Lake 
East Soucie Lake 
East Stewart Lake 
East Thompson Lake 
East Tommy Lake 
East Totten Lake 
East Trump Lake 
East Twin Lake (Peterborough County) 
East Twin Lake (Algoma District) 
East Wakami Lake 
East West Lake 
East Whitefish Lake 
East-West Beaver Ponds 
Eastbrook Lake 
Eastell Lake 
Easter Chicken Lake 
Easter Lake 
Eastern Lake (Simcoe County) 
Eastern Lake (Kenora District) 
Eastford Lake 
Eastman Lake 
Eastsand Lake 
Eastside Lake 
Eatlots Lake 
Eaton Lake (Thunder Bay District) 
Eaton Lake (Sudbury District) 
Eaton Lake (Muskoka District) 
Eau Sale Pond 
Eayrs Lake

Eb–Ec
Ebach Lake 
Ebba Lake 
Ebbs Lake 
Eber Pond 
Eberle Lake 
Ecar Lake 
Echo Lake (Grasett Township, Algoma District)
Echo Lake (Marks Township, Thunder Bay District)
Echo Lake (Lake of Bays)
Echo Lake (Mickle Township, Timiskaming District)
Echo Lake (Frontenac County) 
Echo Lake (Muskoka Lakes) 
Echo Lake (Hastings County) 
Echo Lake (Coldwell Township, Thunder Bay District) 
Echo Lake (Beauchamp Township, Timiskaming District)
Echo Lake (Cochrane District) 
Echo Lake (Sudbury District) 
Echo Lake (Nipissing District) 
Echo Lake (Kenora District) 
Echo Lake (Kehoe Township, Algoma District)
Echo Lake (Syine Township, Thunder Bay District)
Echoing Lake 
Eckford Lake

Ed
Edar Lake 
Eddie Lake 
Eddies Lake 
Eden Lake (Kenora District) 
Eden Lake (Thunder Bay District) 
Eden Lake (Renfrew County) 
Eden Lake (Sudbury District) 
Edgar Lake (Timiskaming District) 
Edgar Lake (Nipissing District) 
Edgar Lake (Cochrane District) 
Edge Lake 
Edgecliff Lake 
Edgewood Lake 
Edhouse Lake 
Edinburgh Lake 
Edison Lake (Timiskaming District) 
Edison Lake (Algoma District) 
Edison Lake (Kenora District) 
Edith Lake (Greenstone)
Edith Lake (Timiskaming District) 
Edith Lake (Flatrock Lake, Thunder Bay District)
Edith Lake (Sudbury District)
Edleston Lake
Edmison Lake
Edmond Lake
Edmondson Lake
Edmunds Lake
Edna Lake (Thunder Bay District)
Edna Lake (McCarthy Township, Sudbury District)
Edna Lake (Frechette Township, Sudbury District)
Edward Lake (Smellie Township, Kenora District)
Edward Lake (Phairs Lake, Kenora District)
Edward Lake (Renfrew County)
Edward Lake (Hastings County)
Edward Lake (Simcoe County)
Edwards Lake (Timmins)
Edwards Lake (Brigstocke Township, Timiskaming District)
Edwards Lake (Sudbury District)
Edwards Lake (Kirkland Lake)
Edwards Lake (Nipissing District)
Edwards Lake (Orkney Township, Cochrane District)
Edwards Lake (Thunder Bay District)
Edwin Lake

Ee–Eg
Eel Lake (Sudbury District)
Eel Lake (Frontenac County)
Eel Lake (Thunder Bay District)
Eel Lake (Nipissing District)
Eels Lake
Eeyore Lake
Efby Lake
Effingham Lake
Egan Lake (Hastings County)
Egan Lake (Kenora District)
Egg Lake (Gorham Township, Thunder Bay District)
Egg Lake (Brothers Township, Thunder Bay District)
Egg Lake (Kenora District)
Egg Lake (Frontenac County)
Egg Lake (Peterborough County)
Egg Lake (Kenora District)
Egret Lake

Ei–Ek
Eider Lake (Algoma District)
Eider Lake (Kenora District)
Eight Lake
Eight Mile Pond
Eighteen Mile Lake
Eighteen Mile Pond
Eighth Lake
Eighty Acre Lake
Eighty Four Lake
Eileen Lake (Nipissing District)
Eileen Lake (Algoma District)
Eileen Lake (Thunder Bay District)
Eiler Lake
Einar Lake
Eino Lake
Eire Lake
Eisen Lake
Ekal Lake
Ekip Lake
Ekstrom Lake

El
Elam Lake
Elboga Lake
Elbow Lake (Hinchinbrooke Township, Central Frontenac)
Elbow Lake (Esquega Township, Algoma District)
Elbow Lake (Lyman Township, Nipissing District)
Elbow Lake (Renfrew County)
Elbow Lake (Rainy River District)
Elbow Lake (Cleftrock Creek, Kenora District)
Elbow Lake (South Frontenac)
Elbow Lake (Sables-Spanish Rivers)
Elbow Lake (Herbert Township, Nipissing District)
Elbow Lake (Lahontan Township, Thunder Bay District)
Elbow Lake (Jackson Lake, Thunder Bay District)
Elbow Lake (Burwash Township, Sudbury District)
Elbow Lake (Demorest Township, Sudbury District)
Elbow Lake (Buckland Township, Sudbury District)
Elbow Lake (Vermillion River, Kenora District)
Elbow Lake (Huotari Township, Algoma District)
Elbow Lake (Oso Township, Central Frontenac)
Elbow Lake (Parry Sound District))
Elbow Lake (Sayer Township, Algoma District)
Elbow Lake (Shuniah)
Elbow Lake (Lennox and Addington County)
Elbow Lake (Abbey Township, Sudbury District)
Elbow Lake (Balmoral River, Kenora District)
Elbow Lake (Dorion)
Elbow Lake (Arrow Lake, Thunder Bay District)
Elbow Lake (French River)
Elbow Lake (Elizabeth Township, Sudbury District)
Eldee Lake
Eldorado Lake (Hastings County)
Eldorado Lake (Kenora District)
Eldridge Lake
Eleanor Lake (Renfrew County)
Eleanor Lake (Timiskaming District)
Eleanor Lake (Rainy River District)
Eleanor Lake (Algoma District)
Eleanor Lake (Cochrane District)
Eleph Lake
Elephant Head Lake
Elephant Lake (Thunder Bay District)
Elephant Lake (Haliburton County)
Elephant Lake (Algoma District)
Elevation Lake
Elevator Lake
Eleven Mile Lake
Eleventh Lake
Elf Lake (Thunder Bay District)
Elf Lake (Cochrane District)
Elf Lake (Algoma District)
Elga Lake
Elgie Lake
Elgin Lake (Sudbury District)
Elgin Lake (Thunder Bay District)
Eli Lake (Sudbury District)
Eli Lake (Rainy River District)
Eli Lake (Thunder Bay District)
Elinor Lake
Elissa Lake
Eliza Lake (Kenora District)
Eliza Lake (Timiskaming District)
Elizabeth Lake (Timiskaming District)
Elizabeth Lake (Simpson Island, Thunder Bay District)
Elizabeth Lake (Rainy River District)
Elizabeth Lake (Algoma District)
Elizabeth Lake (Sudbury District)
Elizabeth Lake (Purdom Township, Thunder Bay District)
Elizabeth Lakes
Elk Lake (Thunder Bay District)
Elk Lake (Timiskaming District)
Elk Lake (Rainy River District)
Elk Pit
Elka Lake
Elkhorn Lake
Ell Lake
Ella Lake (Valley East, Greater Sudbury)
Ella Lake (Walden, Greater Sudbury)
Ella Lake (Algoma District)
Ellam Lake
Ellard Lake
Ellen Lake
Ellery Lake
Elliot Lake
Elliott Lake
Elliott's Lake
Ellipse Lake
Ellis Lake (Muskoka District)
Ellis Lake (Priske Township, Thunder Bay District)
Ellis Lake (Timiskaming District)
Ellis Lake (Parry Sound District)
Ellis Lake (Wabikoba Creek)
Ellis Pond
Elm Lake (Thunder Bay District)
Elm Lake (Peterborough County)
Elma Lake
Elmer Lake (Frost Township, Algoma District)
Elmer Lake (Desbiens Township, Algoma District)
Elmer Lake (Timiskaming District)
Elmes Lake
Elmhirst Lake
Elmo Lake
Elongate Lake
Elora Lake
Elsbury Lake
Elsie Lake (Timiskaming District)
Elsie Lake (Ashley Township, Algoma District)
Elsie Lake (Thunder Bay District)
Elsie Lake (Nipissing District)
Elsie Lake (Frost Township, Algoma District)
Elsie Lake (Kenora District)
Elson Lake
Elspeth Lake
Elspie Lake
Eltrut Lake
Elva Lake
Elvira Lake
Elvy Lake
Elwood Lake (Eaton Creek, Thunder Bay District)
Elwood Lake (Benner Township, Thunder Bay District)
Ely Lake
Elzevir Lake

Em
Emarton Lake
Embarass Lake
Embargo Lake
Embee Lake
Ember Lake (Sudbury District)
Ember Lake (Timiskaming District)
Embro Pond
Embryo Lake
Emens Lake
Emerald Lake (Afton Township, Sudbury District)
Emerald Lake (Nickle Township, Thunder Bay District)
Emerald Lake (Rainy River District)
Emerald Lake (Borden Township, Sudbury District)
Emerald Lake (Nipissing District)
Emerald Lake (Kenora District)
Emerald Lake (Wellington County)
Emerald Lake (Innes Township, Thunder Bay District)
Emerald Lake (Blind River)
Emerald Lake (Musquash Township, Algoma District)
Emerson Lake (Rose Township, Algoma District)
Emerson Lake (Kenora District)
Emerson Lake (Bracci Township, Algoma District)
Emery Lake
Emil Lake
Emilie Lake
Emily Lake (Thunder Bay District)
Emily Lake (Kawartha Lakes)
Emily Lake (Algoma District)
Emma Lake (Greater Sudbury)
Emma Lake (Nipissing District)
Emma Lake (Sudbury District)
Emmanuel Lake
Emmerson Lake
Emmett Lake
Emmons Lake (Kenora District)
Emmons Lake (Sudbury District)
Emms Lake
Emond Lake (Algoma District)
Emond Lake (Kenora District)
Empey Lake
Empire Lake (Kenora District)
Empire Lake (Empire Creek, Thunder Bay District)
Empire Lake (Greenstone)
Empress Lake
Emsdale Lake

En–Ep
Ena Lake
Encamp Lake
End Lake (Kenora District)
End Lake (Algoma District)
Endikai Lake
Endleman Lake
Endless Lake
Endogoki Lake
Endomink Lake
Endospruce Lakes
Endportage Lake
Engineer Lake
Engineers Lake
Engler Lake
English Lake (Kenora District)
English Lake (Sudbury District)
Enid Lake
Enira Lake
Ennis Lake
Eno Lake
Enrae Lake
Enright Lake
Ensign Lake
Enterprise Lake
Entwine Lake
Eos Lake
Eplett Lake

Er
Erables Lake
Erato Lake
Eric Lake (Black River, Thunder Bay District)
Eric Lake (Algoma District)
Eric Lake (Syine Township, Thunder Bay District)
Eric Lake (Harris Lake, Kenora District)
Eric Lake (Osnaburgh 63A)
Eric Lake (Kenorain Creek, Kenora District)
Erichsen Lake
Erickson Lake
Lake Erie
Eris Lake
Erkett's Pond
Erly Lake
Ermine Lake (Thunder Bay District)
Ermine Lake (Algoma District)
Ermine Lake (Nipissing District)
Ernest Lake
Ernie Lake
Eros Lake
Errett Lake
Errey Lake
Errington Lake
Error Lake

Es
Escape Lake
Eskay Lake
Esker Lake (Nipissing District)
Esker Lake (De Gaulle Township, Sudbury District)
Esker Lake (Algoma District)
Esker Lake (Marshay Township, Sudbury District)
Esker Lake (Steel River, Thunder Bay District)
Esker Lake (Elbow Lake, Thunder Bay District)
Esker Lake (Kenora District)
Esker Lake (Timiskaming District)
Esker Lakes
Eskimo Lake
Eskwanonwatin Lake
Esmee Lake
Esnagami Lake
Esnagi Lake
Esox Lake
Espaniel Lake
Ess Lake (Thunder Bay District)
Ess Lake (Algoma District)
Essem Lake
Essens Lake
Esser Lake
Esson Lake
Esten Lake
Esther Lake (Kenora District)
Esther Lake (Sudbury District)
Estrangement Lake

Et–Eu
Etamame Lake
Ethel Lake (Sudbury District)
Ethel Lake (Crooked Lake, Kenora District)
Ethel Lake (Redditt Township, Kenora District)
Ethelma Lake
Ethier Lake (Sudbury District)
Ethier Lake (Nipissing District)
Ethlouise Lake
Etna Lake
Etta Lake (Kenora District)
Etta Lake (Parry Sound District)
Etwill Lake
Eu Lake
Eucalia Lake
Euclide Lake
Eugenia Lake
Eula Lake
Eureka Lake (Cochrane District)
Eureka Lake (Sudbury District)
Eustace Lake
Eustache Lake

Ev
Eva Lake (Kenora District)
Eva Lake (Thunder Bay District)
Eva Lake (Rainy River District)
Eva Lake (Algoma District)
Evans Lake (Thunder Bay District)
Evans Lake (Parry Sound District)
Evans Lake (Elliot Lake)
Evans Lake (Tupper Township, Algoma District)
Evans Lake (Kenora District)
Evans Lake (Hastings County)
Eve Lake
Evelyn Lake (Thunder Bay District)
Evelyn Lake (Timmins)
Evelyn Lake (Arnott Township, Algoma District)
Evelyn Lake (Carney Township, Algoma District)
Evelyn Lake (Sudbury District)
Evelyn Lake (Cochrane)
Even Lake
Evening Lake
Ever Lake
Everest Lake
Everett Lake (Timiskaming District)
Everett Lake (Algoma District)
Evonymus Lake

Ew–Ez
Ewart Lake
Ewayea Lake
Excalibur Lake
Expanse Lake (Algoma District)
Expanse Lake (Sudbury District)
Expanse Lake (Timiskaming District)
Expanse Lake (Kenora District)
Expansion Lake
Expectation Lake
Exploration Lake
Explorer Lake
Export Lake
Extension Lake
Exton Lake
Eyapamikama Lake
Eye Lake (Rainy River District)
Eye Lake (Kenora District)
Eye Lake (Nipissing District)
Eyelet Lake (Rainy River District)
Eyelet Lake (Sudbury District)
Eyelid Lake
Eyes Lake
Eyre Lake
Ezma Lake
Ezra Lake

References
 Geographical Names Data Base, Natural Resources Canada

E